Harbour Esplanade is a waterfront street and thoroughfare in Docklands, an inner suburb of Melbourne, Victoria, Australia. It runs roughly north-south from Navigation Drive in the south to Docklands Drive in the north. The road also forms the eastern boundary of the Victoria Harbour inlet and is adjacent to Victoria Dock.

The esplanade is a core element of the Docklands urban renewal precinct and is known for housing Docklands Stadium and several converted dock buildings that now serve as pubs and function spaces. Harbour Esplanade is also the location of office buildings and restaurants, whilst the Capital City Trail runs parallel along some of its length.

It has been described as Melbourne's waterfront boulevard and its future potential is compared to the successful Circular Quay in Sydney.

History 

Harbour Esplanade was previously known as Footscray Road - between Dudley Street and Pigott Street (now renamed Bourke Street) - and Charles Grimes Bridge Road, connecting West Melbourne through the Docklands precinct over the Yarra River to South Melbourne, without needing to go through central Melbourne. The road was dual-carriageway through a mainly freight and heavy industrial area that had fallen into dis-use by the mid-1980s. With the transformation of Harbour Esplanade as a dock-side boulevard, Wurundjeri Way was built as a replacement through route in 1999.

Creation 
Harbour Esplanade was gazetted as part of the Docklands urban renewal project in 2007. Initially a somewhat disconnected street with minimal attractions and accessibility, the area is now the focus of further development and government grants to help improve the amenity of the Docklands area.

In response to criticisms regarding lack of green space, Norfolk Island Pine trees were planted along the length of the esplanade in 2011, in addition to the creation of dedicated bike lane and pedestrian pathway. Tram tracks were also realigned and the vision for Harbour Esplanade to connect the Yarra River to Victoria Harbour in a more complete way was realised.

Places Victoria has also funded the construction of Hortus, a glasshouse with an edible plant installation, café and outdoor environment to bring further life to the area.

Criticism 
In 2010, Places Victoria's general manager David Young acknowledged that Harbour Esplanade "doesn't stack up". Kim Dovey, professor of architecture and design at the University of Melbourne stated that Harbour Esplanade was "too big" for the Docklands precinct. The Lord Mayor has also criticised initial planning for the esplanade, claiming it should have been the first thing considered when planning Docklands.

Future 

Proposals have been submitted to improve the Victoria Harbour precinct, with a focus on Harbour Esplanade as the main thoroughfare. Proposals include water taxis, a ferry terminal, opera performances and a function room along the esplanade offering waterside views. Lord Mayor of Melbourne Robert Doyle described his vision for the precinct as "a range of complementary uses and buildings... on Harbour Esplanade, not just this big wide expanse". Addition proposals have been put forward to dock heritage vessels such as the Alma Doepel and the Enterprize in Victoria Harbour.

Notable buildings 

Several buildings and structures along Harbour Esplanade are listed on the Victorian Heritage Register and/or classified by the National Trust of Australia, including:
 Victoria Dock
 Alma Doepel
 Gasworks Superintendent's Residence
In addition, there are several newer landmarks:
 Docklands Park
 Docklands Stadium
 Comtechport
 National Australia Bank Headquarters
 Cow up a tree statue

Transport 
Harbour esplanade is serviced by the City Circle tram in addition to tram route 70 and route 75.

Future plans also include the creation of a Ferry Terminal via Victoria Harbour.

References

Roads in Victoria (Australia)
Transport in the City of Melbourne (LGA)